Geyson leads here. For people named Gayson, see Gayson

Kevin Geyson (born 12 April 1984) is a Canadian diver who specializes in the 10 m platform individual and synchronized event.

He participated at the 2010 Commonwealth Games, winning a bronze medal with partner Eric Sehn in the 10 m synchro while classifying fourth in the individual competition. At the 2011 Pan American Games he again won the bronze medal in the 10 m synchro with the same teammate while classifying 10th in the individual event.

During the 2011 World Aquatics Championships he suffered from a road accident when he was hit by a car after alighting from a bus; the incident occurred a week after Geyson ranked 8th in the 10 m synchro. Kevin is now an athletic therapist, personal trainer and model in Canada.

References

External links
 Kevin Geyson's profile on the Diving Canada website

1984 births
Living people
Canadian male divers
Commonwealth Games bronze medallists for Canada
Commonwealth Games medallists in diving
Divers at the 2010 Commonwealth Games
Divers at the 2011 Pan American Games
Pan American Games bronze medalists for Canada
Pan American Games medalists in diving
Divers from Winnipeg
Medalists at the 2011 Pan American Games
Medallists at the 2010 Commonwealth Games